Evergreen Beach, also known as Evergreen Brightsand, is an organized hamlet in the Canadian province province of Saskatchewan under the jurisdiction of the Rural Municipality of Mervin No. 499.

Geography 
Evergreen Beach is on the eastern shore of Brightsand Lake.

Demographics 

See also 
List of communities in Saskatchewan
List of designated places in Saskatchewan
List of hamlets in Saskatchewan

References

External links 

Designated places in Saskatchewan
Mervin No. 499, Saskatchewan
Organized hamlets in Saskatchewan
Division No. 17, Saskatchewan